Ghimpați may refer to several places in Romania:

Ghimpați, a commune in Giurgiu County 
 Ghimpați, a village in Răcari town, Dâmbovița County
 Ghimpați, a village in Fărcașele Commune, Olt County
 Ghimpați, a former village in Valea Dragului Commune, Giurgiu County
 Ghimpați, a former village, now part of Poiana village, Ciulnița Commune, Ialomița County